Ladislav Štovčik (born 13 March 1950) is a former Slovak football defender who played professionally only for VSS Košice. He made 109 appearances at the Czechoslovak First League.

Štovčík played seven matches for the Czechoslovakia under-23 team and became the European under-23 champion in 1972.

References

1950 births
Living people
Slovak footballers
Czechoslovak footballers
FC VSS Košice players
Association football fullbacks